Chlorophytum laxum (Bichetii grass, Siam lily, false lily turf, wheat plant) is a flowering plant species in the genus Chlorophytum, widespread through tropical Africa, Asia, and Australia.

Taxonomy

Synonyms
Anthericum bichetii 
Anthericum parviflorum 
Chlorophytum abyssinicum 
Chlorophytum acaule 
Chlorophytum bichetii 
Chlorophytum debile 
Chlorophytum falcatum 
Chlorophytum javanicum 
Chlorophytum laxiflorum 
Chlorophytum laxum f. javanicum 
Chlorophytum parviflorum 
Chlorophytum xerotinum 
Nolina javanica 
Phalangium laxum 
Phalangium parviflorum

References
Prodr. Fl. Nov. Holl. 277 1810.
The Plant List entry
JSTOR entry
Flora of China entry

Agavoideae
Taxa named by Robert Brown (botanist, born 1773)